Fillebrown is a surname. Notable people with the surname include:

Charlotte Ann Fillebrown Jerauld (1820–1845), American poet and story writer
Thomas Fillebrown (1836–1908), American dentist